Kristina Sabasteanski-Viljanen (born in Pittsfield, Massachusetts on April 1, 1969) is a former instructor at the University of Southern Maine and a retired American biathlete who has competed in two Olympics.

References 

Sportspeople from Pittsfield, Massachusetts
University of Southern Maine faculty
Living people
American female biathletes
Olympic biathletes of the United States
Biathletes at the 1998 Winter Olympics
Biathletes at the 2002 Winter Olympics
1969 births
Castleton State College alumni
American women academics
21st-century American women
U.S. Army World Class Athlete Program